Ecole Polytechnique de Tunisie (EPT), ( al-madrasa at-tounisia lit-takniat,  or EPT) is a Tunisian Engineering School. It was founded on June 26, 1991 by order of law N°91-42, and welcomed its first students in September 1994.

The school is under the sole supervision of the University of Carthage and recruits from a pool of top ranking students from the national engineering school entrance exam. The majority of students belong to the Preparatory Institute for Scientific and Technical Studies.

Admission 
EPT selects only fifty students each academic year from a pool of approximately 4000 students that passed the Tunisian engineering school entrance exam: 30 are selected from MP (Math-Physics) major, 10 are selected from the PC (Physics-Chemistry) major and 10 are selected from T (Technology) major. Admitted students receive three years of multidisciplinary engineering curriculum.

See also
 University of Carthage

References

External links 
 Tunisia Polytechnic School official web site.
 Tunisia Polytechnic School virtual tour.

Education in Tunisia
Educational organisations based in Tunisia
Scientific organisations based in Tunisia
Carthage University